The first generation of the BMW 1 Series consists of the BMW E81 (3-door hatchback), BMW E82 (coupe), BMW E87 (5-door hatchback) and BMW E88 (convertible) compact cars. The E81/E82/E87/E88 generation was produced from 2004 until 2013 and is sometimes collectively referred to as the E8x. The E8x replaced the 3 Series Compact as the entry level models of the BMW range.

The chassis has an aluminum multi-link suspension, and a rear-wheel drive layout with a longitudinally-mounted engine giving 50:50 weight balance, which was a rare configuration in the hatchback market segment as cars use front-wheel drive. The engines available were four-cylinder turbo-diesel, four-cylinder naturally aspirated petrol, six-cylinder naturally aspirated petrol and six-cylinder turbocharged petrol (the latter only available on coupe and convertible models). 

The highest performance trim is the 1 Series M Coupé which was powered by the BMW N54 turbocharged inline-six engine mated to a six-speed manual transmission. It was produced in only the coupe body style and is considered the predecessor to the BMW M2.

Following the introduction of the F20/F21 1 Series in 2011, the E81/E87 hatchback models began to be phased out, while the E82/E88 coupes and convertibles remained in production until 2013, when they were replaced by the F22/F23 2 Series models.

Development and launch 
Initially, BMW considered adopting the Rover R30 design program into the upcoming 1 Series; however, it was eventually decided to develop the E8x alongside the E90 3 Series. The E8x shares approximately 60% of components with the E90, including front and rear suspension, structure, chassis, engines, drivetrain, hardware and electronic elements.

The 1 Series was developed under design director Chris Bangle, At the 2002 Geneva Motor Show, the CS1 Concept previewed the 1 Series design. with Christopher Chapman leading the exterior design for the hatchback models.

The first 1 Series production models – in the E87 five-door hatchback body style – were launched at the Paris Motor Show in September 2004.

In May 2005, in a commercial for the 1 Series Hatchback, Kermit the Frog was shown driving a BMW 1 Series around in a desert making figure-eights, showcasing the car's agility.

In 2012, a number of 1 Series vehicles were stolen in the United Kingdom, due to thieves programming a blank key fob to start the car through the on-board diagnostics (OBD) connection. This security flaw was later patched, for both existing vehicles and new cars produced since.

Model year changes

2007
In March 2007, the E87 five-door hatchback received a facelift (also called LCI). Changes included the N43 four-cylinder engine replacing the N45 and N46 engines, various changes to improve fuel economy (marketed as EfficientDynamics), electric power steering replacing the traditional hydraulic power steering, revised bumpers and interior changes.

In May 2007, the E81 three-door hatchback models were released.

In November 2007, the E82 coupe models were released, followed by the E88 convertible models soon after.

2011 
In 2011, the E82 coupé and E88 convertible models received a facelift. Changes included headlights and taillight revisions, new front/rear bumpers and minor revisions to the interior. For the 135i model, the N55 engine replaced the N54. Even though many engines are the same, the facelifted 1 Series fuel consumption is slightly higher in some models such as the 123d, and slightly lower in some models such as the 120i.

Body styles 

Reviews of the 1 Series' exterior styling were mixed, with the unusual proportions of the hatchback model often receiving criticism.

5-door hatchback (E87) 
The 1 Series was launched globally in September 2004 as the E87 five-door hatchback.

The E87 was produced from 2004 until 2011, with the model range consisting of the 116i, 116d, 118i, 118d, 120i, 120d, 123d and 130i. Kerb Weight: 1340 kg (2954 lbs.).

3-door hatchback (E81) 
The E81 three-door hatchback models were produced from July 2007 until 2012.

As per the five-door body style, the model range consisted of the 116i, 116d, 118i, 118d, 120i, 120d, 123d and 130i. The overall length is the same as the five-door models, and the kerb weight is  lighter.

2-door coupe (E82) 
The 1 Series Coupé (E82) was unveiled in 2007 at the Frankfurt Motor Show and went on sale on 24 November 2007.

The model range consisted of the 118d, 118i, 120i, 120d, 123d, 125i, 125se, 128i, 135i, 135is, and the M Coupé. In North America, the E82 went on sale in October 2007 with the 128i and the 135i models. The E82 was produced until August 2013.

2-door convertible (E88) 
The E88 convertible models were produced from 2007 until June 2013. The model range consisted of the 118d, 118i, 120i, 120d, 123d, 125i, 128i, 135i, and 135is.

The E88 uses a fabric roof (unlike the E93 3 Series convertible, which uses a folding metal roof).

Engines 
The factory specifications are as follows:

Petrol

In most countries, the 135i is the top model of the E82/E88 coupe/convertible range (excluding the limited production 1M Coupe). From 2007 to 2010, the 135i was powered by the N54 twin-turbo 3.0-litre engine with a 6-speed manual or a 6-speed automatic transmission. From 2010, the 135i engine was upgraded to the N55 single-turbo 3.0-litre engine with a 6-speed manual or a 7-speed dual-clutch transmission. The differential fitted to the 135i uses double-helical ball bearings, which operate at a lower temperature and reach operating temperature quicker, due to a reduction of fluid required in the differential. The 135i brakes are 6-piston front calipers and 2-piston rear calipers, with disk sizes of 338 mm and 324 mm respectively.

Another E82/E88 coupe/convertible trim sold only in the United States and Canada was the 128i, which was powered by a  version of the 3.0 litre BMW N52 inline-6 engine.

The 130i is the top model of the E81/E87 hatchback range and was released in September 2004. It is powered by the N52 3.0-litre naturally aspirated engine and transmission choices were a 6-speed manual or a 6-speed automatic.

Diesel

Transmissions 
In early 2006, the 5-speed manual transmission was phased out in favour of the 6-speed Getrag GS6 gearbox.

Several 6-speed automatic transmissions were used- the ZF 6HP for the 135i, GM 6L50 for the 128i, and GM 6L45 for 116i. A 7-speed Getrag dual-clutch transmission ("DCT") was available for the 135i model from 2010.

Special editions

1 Series M Coupé 

The BMW 1 Series M Coupe (often referred to as the "1M") is the high-performance model of the E82 coupe range, sold under the BMW M performance sub-brand. While BMW naming convention would have called the car the "M1", an alternate name was chosen to avoid confusion with the 1970s BMW M1 supercar.

At the 2007 Tokyo Auto Show, BMW unveiled the 1 Series tii Concept, which was thought to be a preview of the M version of the 1 Series. However, the eventual 1M model appeared four years later and with significant differences, such as an engine with six-cylinders instead of four.

The 1M was BMW M's second turbocharged engine (after the S63 V8 which debuted in the X6M). The sole transmission available was a six-speed manual.

Initial plans were to limit production of the 1M Coupe to 2,700 units, but the final production total was 6,309.

The 1M Coupe placed third in the Evo Magazine 2011 Car of the Year awards. It also featured on Top Gear on 26 June 2011 and recorded a time of 1:25.0 around the Top Gear test track under damp conditions and received "Richard Hammond's Car of the Year 2011" award in the Top Gear magazine.

ActiveE electric car trial 

The BMW ActiveE was an electric car based on the E82 coupe that was produced in small quantities for demonstration and testing purposes. The cars were leased to customers for two years, following which they were taken off the road. A total of 1,100 vehicles were produced, with 700 of these being delivered to U.S. customers beginning in January 2012.

Motorsports 

In 2006, a BMW 120d modified with a BMW customer racing kit entered by "Schubert Motors" placed 5th at the Nurburgring 24 Hours in a field of 220 cars.

Beric Lynton won the 2014 Australian Production Car Championship driving a BMW 1M.

In 2019, the UK based 750 Motor Club introduced a one make mini endurance series using the 2004-2006 116i car. Modified from factory production specifications with a coil over suspension kit, reworked motorsport exhaust and re-programmed ECU the cars race in a 90-minute multiple driver format. For 2020, the series attracted regular grids of over 25 cars with more than 50 cars having been built by both privateers and professional teams.

BMW 135is (United States and Canada) 
The 135is coupe and convertible model was sold only for the 2013 model year in the United States and Canada. In other markets, the next generation F20 1 Series had replaced the E82/E88 by this stage, with the top-of-the-line M135i sharing the same engine as the 135is. 

Other upgrades include sports suspension, an M Sport body kit, and 18-inch wheels.

Production and sales
The 1 Series was built in Regensburg and Leipzig, Germany.

The E8x accounted for nearly one-fifth of the total BMW sales in 2008.

Sales statistics according to BMW's annual reports:

References 

1 Series
Cars introduced in 2004
2010s cars